Kevin Philip Reeves (born 20 October 1957) is the Chief Scout at Everton football club. He is an English former professional footballer who played as a forward scoring 103 goals from 333 appearances in the Football League playing for AFC Bournemouth, Norwich City, Manchester City and Burnley. He was capped twice by England at full international level. As of 4 July 2013, he is Everton's head scout.

Career
Reeves was born in Burley, Hampshire. started his career as an apprentice with AFC Bournemouth. He made his League debut in the 1974–75 season, and played 63 games before John Bond signed him for Norwich City in January 1977 for a fee of £50,000. After 133 games and 42 goals in all competitions, he earned Norwich their first £1 million fee when he was transferred to Manchester City in March 1980 for £1.25m. Reeves scored 39 goals from 158 appearances in all competitions, including a penalty in City's defeat at the hands of Tottenham Hotspur in the 1981 FA Cup Final replay. He subsequently played for Burnley, continuing his trend of playing under John Bond, but was forced to retire from the professional game at the age of 26 because of a hip injury.

He also made ten appearances for England Under-21, three for England B, and two for England at senior level.

Reeves later coached under Bond at Burnley and Birmingham City, teamed up with Brian Flynn as his assistant manager at both Wrexham and Swansea City, and scouted for clubs including Stoke City and latterly Swansea City, Wigan Athletic and Everton as a member of Roberto Martínez' backroom staff.

References

External links
 
 Stats, biography and photo at Sporting Heroes

1957 births
Living people
People from New Forest District
English footballers
England international footballers
England B international footballers
England under-21 international footballers
Association football forwards
AFC Bournemouth players
Norwich City F.C. players
Manchester City F.C. players
Burnley F.C. players
English Football League players
Burnley F.C. non-playing staff
Birmingham City F.C. non-playing staff
Swansea City A.F.C. non-playing staff
Stoke City F.C. non-playing staff
Wigan Athletic F.C. non-playing staff
Everton F.C. non-playing staff
FA Cup Final players